Richard Bland (born 3 February 1973) is an English professional golfer.

Career
Bland was born in Burton upon Trent, Staffordshire. He turned professional in 1996 and reached the final stage of the European Tour's qualifying school in 1997 to gain his card on Europe's second tier Challenge Tour for 1998. In 2001 he won for the first time, at the season ending Challenge Tour Grand Final. The win elevated him in the rankings sufficiently to gain a place on the European Tour for 2002.

During his first season on the European Tour, Bland’s best tournament finish was a tie for 2nd place at the Murphy's Irish Open, losing in a playoff, and ended the year in 73rd place on the Order of Merit. In subsequent seasons, he failed to win enough money to maintain his card on the European Tour several times but regained his playing status each time, via the Challenge Tour rankings in 2004, 2008, and 2019, and via qualifying school in 2007 and 2011.

In May 2021, in his 478th start on the European Tour, Bland achieved his first victory at the Betfred British Masters. At age 48, he became the oldest first-time winner on the European Tour; only Malcolm MacKenzie, with 509, had played more tournaments before claiming his first win on the tour. In June 2021, Bland played in the U.S. Open for just the second time in his career. At 48 years old, he became the oldest player to ever hold a share of the lead of the U.S. Open after two rounds, however he fell back over the weekend to finish in a tie for 50th. With eight top-10 finishes during the 2021 European Tour season, Bland finished a career-best 11th place on the Race to Dubai rankings.

In January 2022, Bland finished as runner-up at the Slync.io Dubai Desert Classic, losing to Viktor Hovland in a playoff. 

Being just outside the Top 50 in the Official World Golf Ranking in March 2022, Bland looked to find form in order to qualify for the Masters Tournament. He won his group at the WGC-Dell Technologies Match Play, halving with Bryson DeChambeau as well as beating Talor Gooch and Lee Westwood along the way. However, he was defeated in the last 16 by Dustin Johnson, ultimately just missing out on progressing to the Top 50. Bland made his full PGA Tour debut the following week at the Valero Texas Open, needing a victory to get into The Masters. He recorded a Top-30 finish, seeing him move to a highest ranking of 48th. In June, Bland joined the inaugural LIV Golf Invitational Series.

Amateur wins
1994 European Under 21 Championship

Professional wins (2)

European Tour wins (1)

European Tour playoff record (1–2)

Challenge Tour wins (1)

Results in major championships
Results not in chronological order in 2020.

CUT = missed the half-way cut
"T" = tied
NT = No tournament due to COVID-19 pandemic

Results in World Golf Championships

1Cancelled due to COVID-19 pandemic

QF, R16, R32, R64 = Round in which player lost in match play
"T" = Tied
NT = No tournament
Note that the Championship and Invitational were discontinued from 2022.

Team appearances
Amateur
European Youths' Team Championship (representing England): 1994

See also
2007 European Tour Qualifying School graduates
2008 Challenge Tour graduates
2011 European Tour Qualifying School graduates
2019 Challenge Tour graduates

References

External links

English male golfers
European Tour golfers
LIV Golf players
Sportspeople from Burton upon Trent
Sportspeople from Southampton
1973 births
Living people